Cockfield Mill is a  tower mill at Cockfield, Suffolk, England which has been converted to residential accommodation.

History
Cockfield Mill was erected in 1891 by Brewer & Sillitoe, the Long Melford millwrights. It replaced Pepper Mill, an earlier tower mill on the site. It ceased work in 1900. The cap was removed c1918 and the mill was used for many years as a store. The empty tower has been converted to residential accommodation.

Description

Cockfield Mill is a four storey tower mill. It had a domed cap winded by a fantail. The four Patent sails drove two pairs of millstones.

References

External links
Windmill World webpage on Cockfield Mill.

Windmills in Suffolk
Tower mills in the United Kingdom
Windmills completed in 1891
Grinding mills in the United Kingdom
Cockfield, Suffolk